Tacloban, officially the City of Tacloban, is a 1st class highly urbanized city in the Eastern Visayas region of the Philippines. The city is autonomous from the province of Leyte, although it serves as its provincial capital. According to the 2020 census, Tacloban has a population of 251,881, making it the most populous city in the Eastern Visayas.

Tacloban City was briefly the capital of the Philippines under the Commonwealth Government, from October 20, 1944, to February 27, 1945. In an extensive survey conducted by the Asian Institute of Management Policy Center and released in July 2010, Tacloban City ranks as the fifth most competitive city in the Philippines, and second in the emerging cities category. On November 8, 2013, the city was largely destroyed by Typhoon Haiyan, having previously suffered similar destruction and loss of life in 1897 and 1912. On January 17, 2015, Pope Francis visited Tacloban during his Papal Visit to the Philippines and held a mass at Barangay San Jose, and later he led mass of 30,000 people in front of the airport.

History

Tacloban was first known as Kankabatok, an allusion to the first inhabitants – Kabatok. They established their dwellings in the vicinity of the present day Santo Niño Church. Others who came later were Gumoda, Haraging and Huraw who erected their own settlements in nearby sites. Huraw's domain is the hill where the city hall now sits. The combined settlements acquired the name Kankabatok, meaning "property of Kabatoks". 

The constant threat of pirates due to its lack of a natural barrier hindered the development and progress of the settlement.  And so the place never figured out in the early centuries of the Spanish colonization of Leyte. When the Jesuits (the first evangelizers of Leyte) left in 1768, the Augustinians took over and in 1770 they established the barrio with a chapel (visita) of Tacloban under the jurisdiction of Palo.

The Augustinians who came from the Province of the Holy Name of Jesus based in Cebu were also responsible in introducing the devotion to the Santo Niño becoming therefore the heavenly patron of the settlement.  With the Moro raids in check, the place became a hub for commercial activity and soon after the place was renamed Tacloban becoming an independent municipality and then capital of the province of Leyte.  In 1843, the Augustinians ceded the administration of the parish to the Franciscans.

The change of the name came about in this manner: Kankabatok was a favorite haunt of fishermen.  They would use a bamboo contraption called a "taklub" to catch crabs, shrimps or fish. When asked where they were going, the fishermen would answer, "(to) tarakluban", which meant the place where they used the device to catch these marine resources. Eventually, the name Tarakluban or Tacloban took prominence.

It is not known when Tacloban became a municipality because records supporting this fact were destroyed during a typhoon. It is commonly believed that Tacloban was officially proclaimed a municipality in 1770s. In 1768, Leyte and Samar were separated into two provinces, each constituting a politico-military province. Due to its strategic location, Tacloban became a vital trading point between the two provinces.

The capital of Leyte was transferred from one town to another with Tacloban as the last on February 26, 1830. The decision to make Tacloban the capital was based on the following reasons: 1) ideal location of the port and 2) well-sheltered and adequate facilities. On June 20, 1952, Tacloban was proclaimed a chartered city by virtue of Republic Act No. 760.

The arrival of Colonel Arthur Murray in 1901 made him the first military governor of Leyte. His first official act was the opening of Tacloban port to world commerce. Before World War II, Tacloban was the commercial, education, social and cultural center of the Province of Leyte. Copra and abaca were exported in large quantities. The leading institutions were: Leyte Normal School, Leyte High School, Leyte Trade School, Holy Infant Academy and Tacloban Catholic Institute.

In November 1912, a typhoon swept through the central Philippines and "practically destroyed" Tacloban. In Tacloban and Capiz on the island of Panay, the death toll was 15,000, half the population of those cities at the time.

On May 25, 1942, Japanese forces landed in Tacloban, signalling the beginning of their two-year occupation of Leyte. They fortified the city and improved its airfield. Since San Pedro Bay was ideal for larger vessels, the Japanese Imperial Naval Forces made Tacloban a port of call and entry. This time was considered the darkest in the history of Tacloban and the country due to the incidences of torture among civilians, including the elderly. In response, guerrilla groups operated in Leyte – the most notable of which was the group of Ruperto Kangleon.

Leyte was the first to be liberated by the combined Filipino and American troops. General Douglas MacArthur's assault troops landed in the Tacloban and Palo beaches (White Beach and Red Beach, respectively) and in the neighboring town of Dulag (Blue Beach) on October 20, 1944. These landings signaled the eventual victory of the Filipino and American forces and the fulfillment of MacArthur's famous promise: "I Shall Return."

Three days later, on October 23, at a ceremony at the Capitol Building in Tacloban, MacArthur, accompanied by President Sergio Osmeña, made Tacloban the temporary seat of the Commonwealth Government and temporary capital of the Philippines until the complete liberation of the country. The provincial government of Leyte and the municipal government of Tacloban were re-established.

Paulo Jaro was the Liberation mayor of Tacloban. The first mayor of this capital upon inauguration of the Philippine Republic was Epifanio Aguirre.

On January 8, 1960, MacArthur made his "sentimental" journey to Leyte. He was greeted with cheers by locals when he visited Tacloban.

The city was proclaimed as a highly urbanized city by President Gloria Macapagal Arroyo on October 4, 2008 and ratified by the people on December 18, 2008. Tacloban was officially declared an HUC at 10:40PM of that day.

2013 Typhoon Haiyan 

On November 8, 2013 (PST), Tacloban was hit by the full force of Typhoon Haiyan, causing massive destruction across the city. Dead bodies were scattered on the streets, trees were uprooted, and a  storm surge largely destroyed the airport, though it functioned soon after as a makeshift command and evacuation center. After taking a helicopter flight over the city, US Marine Brigadier General Paul Kennedy was quoted as saying, "I don't believe there is a single structure that is not destroyed or severely damaged in some way – every single building, every single house." Widespread looting and violence is reported to have taken place and local government virtually collapsed, as many city officials were victims. President Aquino declared a state of emergency in Tacloban. The official final death toll stood at 6,201.

2015 Papal visit 

On January 17, 2015, Pope Francis, the leader of the Roman Catholic Church, arrived in Tacloban to celebrate Mass with the survivors of Haiyan (Yolanda). The pope arrived at Daniel Z. Romualdez Airport on a flight operated by Philippine Airlines.

Geography
Tacloban is located on the northeastern tip of Leyte island, with its easternmost part facing Cancabato Bay. The bay is at the east mouth of San Juanico Strait. The Tacloban territory follows the length of the strait, along with Babatngon municipality north of the city. The strait divides the islands of Leyte and Samar.

Barangays
The City of Tacloban is politically subdivided into 138 barangays, each having its own council.

Climate
Tacloban has a tropical rainforest climate (Köppen: Af) but due to the numerous cyclones present in the area, the climate is not equatorial. Tropical rainforest climates are tropical climates in which there is no dry season – all months have mean precipitation values of at least . Tropical rainforest climates have no pronounced summer or winter; it is typically wet throughout the year and rainfall is both heavy and frequent. One day in an equatorial climate can be very similar to the next, while the change in temperature between day and night may be larger than the average change in temperature between "summer" and "winter".

Demographics

According to the 2020 census, Tacloban has a population of 251,881 inhabitants.

Tacloban is predominantly a Waray-speaking city. The language is also officially called Lineyte-Samarnon ("Leyte-Samarnon") and is spoken by more than 90% of the total city population. Waray-Waray, aside from being the native language of the city, is also the lingua franca used in the city among Filipinos of various ethnic groups.

Tacloban is culturally and linguistically diverse. A decade before the end of Spanish sovereignty, it was largely a typical colonial community: most of its residents were either pure Iberian families or the new generations of Spanish-Filipino blood. Today's population consists of a mix of Spanish and Chinese mestizos, foreign expatriates and native Leyteños.

Other Filipino ethnic groups who migrated to the city are the Cebuano/Kana/Visayan speaking populace accounts for 6.08% of the total population, 0.80% are Tagalog, 0.10% are Ilocano, 0.07% are Kapampangan, and 2.95% come from other ethnic origins.

88.52% of the residents of Tacloban City are Roman Catholic; 6.12% are Muslims (most are Maranao migrants from Mindanao); 0.83% are of the indigenous Christian denomination, Iglesia ni Cristo; 0.94% are Evangelicals (born-again Christians); Baptists 0.80%; 0.49% Seventh-Day Adventists. Others comprise 3.10%.

Economy

 
Tacloban is the economic center of the entire Eastern Visayas, with an economy largely focused on agriculture, commerce, and tourism. Proximal to the city proper is the 237-hectare Eastern Visayas Agri-Industrial Growth Center (EVRGC), which was approved and accredited by the Philippine Economic Zone Authority by virtue of Presidential Proclamation No. 1210 on April 23, 1998. EVRGC serves as an eco-industrial hub with the Tacloban city government as its developer and operator. Several regional broadcasters are also based in the city including ABS-CBN TV-2 Tacloban, GMA TV-10 Tacloban and PRTV-12 Tacloban. The Daniel Z. Romualdez Airport also makes the city a key regional transportation hub.

Tacloban is one of the fastest-growing cities in the Philippines, and has one of the lowest poverty incidence rates in the country (at roughly 9%, while the national poverty incidence stands at 30%). After its massive devastation on November 8, 2013, Tacloban was declared by its local government as a start-up city, which means everything had to start back from scratch. Currently the city is experiencing a rapid economic recovery.

Government

The executive power of the City Government is vested in the mayor.  The Sangguniang Panlungsod or the city council has the legislative power to create city ordinances.  It is a unicameral body composed of ten elected councilors and certain numbers of ex officio and sectoral representatives.  It is presided by the vice mayor, the mayor and the elected city councilors who are elected-at-large every three years. The current city mayor is Alfred Romualdez.

The city government ceased to be under the supervision of the provincial government after it became a Highly Urbanized City in 2008.  The city is now under the direct supervision of the national government.

Tacloban City is part of the 1st District of Leyte, alongside seven other municipalities: Alangalang, Babatngon, Palo, San Miguel, Santa Fe, Tanauan, and Tolosa. The district is currently represented by Congressman Martin Romualdez.

Official seal

The official Seal of Tacloban is the symbol of the city's identity when it became a city under Republic Act No. 760 on June 20, 1952.

The city's emblem stands for the following physical attributes and character:

Left Portion - Symbolizes the province of Samar (Santa Rita), major supplier of agricultural and marine products to the city, stabilizing its volume of business and trade.
Center - Stands for the beautiful and scenic San Juanico Strait
The Galleon - Illustrates the ship of Ferdinand Magellan who landed in the island of Homonhon, Eastern Samar, the first Philippine island he sighted during the historic circumnavigation of the world
Right Portion - Leyte side, where Tacloban City is located

Culture

The week-long celebrations peaks on June 30, the Grand fiesta of Tacloban celebrated with the traditional turn-over ceremonies of the "Teniente" made by the immediate past Hermano Mayor to the incoming Hermano Mayor. This is accompanied by the ritual of giving the medallion containing the names of all Hermanos Pasados and the Standartes. Fireworks and grand parades mark the occasion. Every house in the city prepares a feast and opens its doors to guests and well wishers.

Subiran Regatta Subiran Regatta is a race of one-man native sailboats with outriggers locally called "subiran" along scenic and historic Leyte Gulf. The race is done without using a paddle but only skills and techniques to manoeuvre the sail. The Subiran Regatta is now on its 32nd year and counting. This contest is done annually on that weeklong celebration of the Tacloban City Fiesta. The race aims to preserve the art of sailing with the wind alone, and to showcase the mastery of this art by local boatmen.

Balyuan Organized by the Department of Tourism and the city government, this activity which only started in 1975 is supposedly a re-enactment of a purported exchange of images between Barrio Buscada of Basey and Sitio Kankabatok, now Tacloban City.  A local story which only saw print in the 20th century purports that in the old days, Sitio Kankabatok was a small barrio under the jurisdiction of Basey town in Samar. During the Feast of Santo Niño, the residents of Sitio Kankabatok would borrow the bigger image of the saint from the chapel of Barrio Buscada in Basey. Santo Niño is the revered patron saint of both Kankabatok and Barrio Buscada. The image is returned promptly after the festivities. When Kankabatok grew into a barrio of its own, the local Catholic authorities decided that the bigger Santo Niño image be retained in prospering village. However, because of its highly questionable anthropological and historical basis, the story can be best understood as simply etiological.  It gives witness to the cultural, ethnographical and historical relationship between the people of south Samar and the eastern seaboard of Leyte.  Likewise, stories of the image missing in Buscada and turning up in Kankabatok aided to this decision of honoring this relationship. The Basey Flotilla bearing the church and government leaders goes on a fluvial procession along San Pedro Bay. A budyong (shell) call announces the sight of the flotilla off Kankabatok Bay.

Sangyaw Festival Sangyaw is an archaic Waray word which means to herald the news. The Sangyaw Festival was created by Imelda Marcos in the 1980s. The festival was revived in 2008 by her nephew, current city mayor Alfred Romualdez. The Sangyaw Festival invites contingents of different performing groups of various festivals in the country to compete in this side of the region. Cash prizes and trophies are at stake as the Sangyaw Festival grooms itself to be a big festival to watch out in the succeeding years.

Transportation

Tacloban is served by air, multicabs, taxis, jeepneys, buses, tricycles and pedicabs. The city host the Daniel Z. Romualdez Airport. The New Transport Terminal of Tacloban City or New Bus Terminal located in Abucay district serves as the land transportation hub to and from various points in the region. The San Juanico Bridge connects the city to the town of Santa Rita in Samar.

Healthcare
 
As the regional center of Eastern Visayas, Tacloban offers a range of healthcare services. There are a number of hospitals and other medical institutions serving the city's population.
Public hospitals
Eastern Visayas Medical Center (EVMC)
Tacloban City Hospital
Private hospitals
ACE Medical Center Tacloban (near Robinsons Marasbaras)
Divine Word Hospital (owned by the Benedictine Sisters)
Our Mother of Mercy Hospital (owned by the Religious Sisters of Mercy)
Remedios Trinidad Romualdez Hospital (owned by the RTR Medical Foundation)
Tacloban Doctors Medical Center (owned by a group of locally prominent doctors)

Education

Tacloban has a variety of educational institutions both public and private.

Notable institutions include:

 UPV Tacloban College (satellite campus of University of the Philippines Visayas)
 Leyte Normal University
 Eastern Visayas State University
 Holy Infant College
 Holy Spirit Foundation College, Inc.
 Holy Virgin of Salvacion Foundation College, Inc.
 ABE International Business College Tacloban
 ACLC College of Tacloban
 AMA College Tacloban (currently located in nearby Palo, Leyte)
 Asia Pacific Career College
 Asian Development Foundation College
 Leyte Progressive High School
 CIE British School Tacloban
 Colegio De La Salle Fondation de Tacloban, Inc.
 Dr. Vicente Orestes Romualdez Educational Foundation (College of Law)
 JE Mondejar Foundation College
 Leyte Colleges
 National Maritime Polytechnic
 Remedios Trinidad Romualdez Medical Foundation
 Sacred Heart College of Tacloban
 St. Scholastica's College, Tacloban (currently located in nearby Palo, Leyte)
 St. Benedict College of Tacloban, Inc.
Liceo del Verbo Divino (formerly "Divine Word University of Tacloban")
St. Therese Educational Center of Leyte (STECL)
St. Therese Christian Development Center Foundation, Inc. (STCDCFI)
St. Therese Educational Foundation of Tacloban, Inc. (STEFTI)
 Saint Arnold Janssen College of Tacloban, Inc.

Sister cities

International
 Fukuyama, Hiroshima, Japan

Notable personalities

Merlie Alunan - poet; instructor
Gina Apostol - writer
Norberto Castillo - 91st Rector Magnificus of the University of Santo Tomas
Andres Centino - 57th Chief of Staff of the Armed Forces of the Philippines
Kim Chiu - Pinoy Big Brother Teen Edition Winner; television and movie star
Dennis Daa - professional basketball player
Dino Daa - professional basketball player
Bullet Dumas - indie and contemporary folk singer-songwriter
Karla Estrada - actress and singer
Ted Failon - news anchor; TV and radio personality
Jose Mari Gonzales - actor; father of Cristina Gonzales-Romualdez
Ruby Ibarra - Filipina-American rapper
Iluminado Lucente - the "grand old man of Waray letters"; poet, playwright, and mayor of Tacloban
Carlo Francisco Manatad - filmmarker and editor
Dan Palami - businessman; manager of Philippine Azkals
Rudy Robles - actor
Benjamin Romualdez - former governor of Leyte; former ambassador to the US, China and Saudi Arabia
Cristina Romualdez - former actress and former mayor of Tacloban City
Ferdinand Martin Romualdez - representative of the 1st District of Leyte; speaker of the House of Representatives
Imelda Romualdez-Marcos - Former First Lady and former Representative for Leyte's 1st District
Lou Salvador - basketball player

References

External links

 Official website
 [ Philippine Standard Geographic Code]
Typhoon Haiyan appears to be the deadliest natural disaster on record
Official Website of the Provincial Government of Leyte

 
1770 establishments in the Philippines
Cities in Leyte (province)
Highly urbanized cities in the Philippines
Populated places established in 1770
Provincial capitals of the Philippines